Khandan Qoli (also Romanized as Khāndān Qolī, Khāndānqolī,  and Khānedānqolī; also known as Khāneh Qulī and Khan Qulī) is a village in Howmeh Rural District, in the Central District of Bijar County, Kurdistan Province, Iran. At the 2006 census, its population was 1,003, in 237 families. The village is populated by Kurds.

References 

Towns and villages in Bijar County
Kurdish settlements in Kurdistan Province